(At the Stop of Broken Hearts) is the sixth studio album by Turkish singer Candan Erçetin. It was released on 16 December 2009 by Pasaj Müzik. The album features elements of pop music, folk music and hip hop. Candan Erçetin is the album's major songwriter, having written ten of its songs on her own. Out of these ten songs, six of them were composed by her as well. All of the songs were arranged by Alper Erinç.

Containing 16 songs in total,  received generally positive reviews from critics, who believed that the main difference of this album with Erçetin's previous work was the greater use of Balkan music elements. The first single that was released from the album was "", which was used on the soundtrack of the 2009 movie  and ranked second on Billboard Türkçe Top 20. Another song from the album, "", was used on the soundtrack of the movie  (2010). After releasing music videos for these two songs, Erçetin made two more music videos for the album: "" and "".

In , Erçetin included a new version of "", originally performed by Esmeray. For the song "", verses from the poems of Neyzen Tevfik and Omar Khayyam were used. Over 100,000 copies of the album were ordered in the music markets, and it ranked first on D&R Best-Selling list in Turkey. The album continued to remain among the top ten by the end of 2010. It also was nominated for the Best Album award at the 2010 Kral Music Awards and Radio Boğaziçi Awards. The album earned Erçetin the Best Female Turkish Pop Music Soloist award at the 2010 Golden Butterfly Awards.

Background and content 

Candan Erçetin released her fifth studio album  in 2004, and continued her career by releasing the albums Remix'5 and Aman Doktor in 2005. Between 2007–08 she presented the program  on TRT 1; she then performed the song "Gelmiyorsun" for the album  (2007) and "Kim" on the album  (2008). In November 2008, she wrote and composed the song "Ben Kimim", which was used on the soundtrack of the 2009 movie . The song was made available on her website for free. In June 2009, it was reported that the recordings for Candan Erçetin's new album were not finished and the album would be released by the end of summer. In December 2009, new information about the album were released.

After recording the album over the course of six months,  was released on 16 December 2009 by Pasaj Müzik. Containing sixteen songs in total, its main songwriter is Erçetin herself, who wrote ten of the album's songs on her own and another one together with Aylin Atalay. Besides Erçetin and Atalay, Cemal Safi, Şemi Diriker, Neyzen Tevfik, Omar Khayyam, Ayşe Kulin and Sinan were the figures whose poems and lyrics were used in the songs. Aside from writing, Erçetin also composed four of the songs on her own and three of them together with the album's music arranger Alper Erinç. The song "Unutama Beni", which had originally appeared in Esmeray's  (1993) was performed again by Erçetin and included in the album. The song "Gözler" featured verses from poems of Neyzen Tevfik and Omar Khayyam. Erçetin rapped on the song "Ninni", written by Aylin Atalay and herself, and different metaphors were used in the lyrics as well. Cemal Safi wrote the lyrics for "Git", while Ayşe Kulin wrote the song "Bahar". The song "Roka Mandolina", which was initially performed by Suzan Kardeş for her 2008 album , was turned into Turkish and included in the album under the title "Vay Halime".

Featuring elements of pop music, folk music and hip hop,  was ordered over 100,000 times in the markets. It topped D&R Best-Selling list in Turkey, and continued to remain among the top ten on the list by the end of 2010. It was nominated for the Best Album award at the 2010 Kral Music Awards and the Radio Boğaziçi Music Awards, but lost the first one to Mustafa Ceceli's first studio album, and the second one to Yalın's  respectively. The album earned Erçetin the Best Female Turkish Pop Music Soloist award at the 2010 Golden Butterfly Awards.

Critical reception 
 received generally positive reviews from music critics, though the views on the album's cover were different. Music website Gerçek Pop published a review in which it was said that Erçetin had passed the "pause phase" in her career and gave the album three stars out of five. It also stated that the album was "a work that many young artists should take note from" and praised Erçetin's "friendly pose" on the cover. The website compared "Git" to Erçetin's hits in the 2000s, and viewed the songs "Unutama Beni", "Vallahi" and "Yalvaramam" as "serious stumbles" in this album. It was also stated that the album would add "only a few highlights to the singer's discography", and except the song "Ninni" nothing new could be found in it. Radioman Michael Kuyucu described Erçetin's new album as "a lottery for her with sixteen new songs after a long period of silence". He stated that he could see the "intellectual line and difference" in this album, and described it as a work that "can be listened to from the beginning to the end". 's Asu Maro wrote that he was obsessed with the album. He stated that it had aimed to affect "broken hearts" and there was a sense of "maturity" in the songs. Mehmet Tez from the same newspaper wrote a negative review for the album's cover and described the songs as "new but nostalgic". Another  journalist, Sezin Sivri, wrote that the work was "something that could be played again and again, an album that could be listened several times". She also named "Bahar" as her favorite song from the album.

Music videos 
The song ranked second on Billboard Türkçe Top 20 and remained on the chart for five weeks.

The third music video was prepared for the song after which the album was named, "Kırık Kalpler Durağında". The song was written and composed by Erçetin and a nominee for the Best Lyrics award at the 2010 Kral Music Awards. The music video was recorded over the course of two days at the Haydarpaşa railway station. The video was directed by Cihangir Ateşağaoğlu and Bozkurt Bayer. Bayer had previously directed many of Erçetin's music videos, including "Elbette" (2000), "Gamsız Hayat" (2002) and "Melek" (2004). The final music video was made for the song "Git", written by Cemal Safi and composed by Erçetin. The video was released in March 2011. It was directed by Bozkurt Bayer and Cihangir Ateşağaoğlu and recorded in Istanbul over the course of three days.

Track listing

Personnel 

Pasaj Müzik – production
Dünya Müzik – producer 
Candan Erçetin – artist, songwriter, composer
Cemal Safi – songwriter
Şemi Diriker – songwriter, composer
Ayşe Kulin – songwriter
Sinan – songwriter
Neyzen Tevfik – songwriter
Ömer Hayyam – songwriter
Aylin Atalay – songwriter
Nurettin Irmak – composer, electric piano
Flavio Santander – composer
Alper Erinç – composer, arranger, guitarist
Mustafa Süder – composer, string instruments, violin solo
Alper Gemici – arranger
Derya Türkan – classic kemenche
Mehmet Akatay – percussion
Nedim Nalbantoğlu – string instruments
Ayşen Tözeniş – string instruments
Alexandr Samoylenko – string instruments
Ceren Gürkan – string instruments
Yonca Aktunç – string instruments
Veysel Samanlıoğlu – violin solo
Gündem – violin group
Çakır 3 – wind instruments group
Erkut Gökgöz – trumpet
Neşko – accordion
Havva Karakaş – vocals
Ayşe Evrim Akaçça – viola, bowed string instruments arrangement
Yaren Budak – viola
Pınar Bayraktar – violoncello
Erman İmayhan – violoncello
Ali Yılmaz – gold thread, arpeggio bağlama
Uğur Gülbaharlı – piano
Cengiz Tural – drums

Credits adapted from s album booklet.

Charts

Release history

References

External links 
Kırık Kalpler Durağında – Discogs

Candan Erçetin albums
2009 albums
Turkish-language albums